Otto III, Holy Roman Emperor (980–1002) was Holy Roman Emperor from 996 until his death.

Otto III may also refer to:

Otto III, Duke of Swabia (died 1057)
Otto III, Count Palatine of Burgundy (1208–1248)
Otto III, Margrave of Brandenburg (1215–1267)
Otto III, Count of Weimar-Orlamünde (1244–1285)
Otto III, Duke of Bavaria (1261–1312)
Otto III of Carinthia (c. 1265–1310)
Otto III, Marquess of Montferrat (died 1378)
Otto III, Prince of Anhalt-Bernburg (died 1404)
Otto III, Count of Waldeck (c. 1389–1458/9)
Otto III, Duke of Pomerania (1444–1464)
Otto III, Count of Rietberg (between 1475 and 1485–1535)

See also 
 Otto I (disambiguation)
 Otto II (disambiguation)
 Otto IV (disambiguation)
 Otto V (disambiguation)
 Otto VI
 Otto VII (disambiguation)
 Otto VIII (disambiguation)